Ihor Orestovych Khudobyak (born 5 April 1987) is a professional Ukrainian football forward.

Honours

Individual
 Summer Universiade champion: 2009
 Ukrainian Second League best player: 2016–17
 Ukrainian Second League top scorer: 2016–17

External links
 
 Official Club's Website Profile (Rus)
 

1987 births
Living people
People from Halych
Ukrainian footballers
Ukraine student international footballers
Ukraine youth international footballers
Ukrainian expatriate footballers
Expatriate footballers in Belarus
Ukrainian expatriate sportspeople in Belarus
Association football forwards
FC Spartak Ivano-Frankivsk players
FC Prykarpattia Ivano-Frankivsk (2004) players
FC Dynamo Kyiv players
FC Dynamo-2 Kyiv players
FC Sevastopol players
FC Gomel players
FC Enerhiya Mykolaiv players
FC Helios Kharkiv players
FC Enerhetyk Burshtyn players
FC Karpaty Halych players
FC Ternopil players
FC Hoverla Uzhhorod players
FC Prykarpattia Ivano-Frankivsk (1998) players
Ukrainian Premier League players
Ukrainian First League players
Ukrainian Second League players
Universiade gold medalists for Ukraine
Universiade medalists in football
Medalists at the 2007 Summer Universiade
Sportspeople from Ivano-Frankivsk Oblast